Nicolas Berejny (born 27 June 1968) is a French alpine skier and 3-time Paralympic Champion.

He competed in the 2006 Winter Paralympics in Turin, Italy.
He won a gold medal in the Slalom and the Giant Slalom, visually impaired, and a bronze medal in the Downhill, visually impaired.

At the 2010 Winter Paralympics in Vancouver, Canada, he won a gold medal in the Super-G, visually impaired.

His sighted guide at Turin 2006 and Vancouver 2010 was Sophie Troc.

External links 

 
 

1968 births
Living people
French male alpine skiers
Paralympic alpine skiers of France
Alpine skiers at the 2010 Winter Paralympics
Paralympic gold medalists for France
Paralympic bronze medalists for France
Medalists at the 2006 Winter Paralympics
Medalists at the 2010 Winter Paralympics
Paralympic medalists in alpine skiing